Deh Now-e Qalandaran (also Romanized as Deh Now-e Qalandarān; also known as Deh Now) is a village in Faramarzan Rural District, Jenah District, Bastak County, Hormozgan Province, Iran. At the 2006 census, its population was 135, in 27 families.

References 

Populated places in Bastak County